Gunko, Hunko or Gun'ko (Ukrainian or Russian: Гунько) is a gender-neutral Ukrainian surname that may refer to
Andrej Hunko (born 1963), German politician
Dmitri Gunko (born 1976), Russian football coach and former player
Sergei Gunko (born 1973), Russian football coach and former player
Yuri Gunko (born 1972), Ukrainian ice hockey player
Yurii Gun'ko, Belarusian chemist

See also
 
 

Ukrainian-language surnames